My Wife's Teacher (Spanish:El profesor de mi mujer, El profesor de mi señora or El amor solfeando) is a 1930 comedy film directed by Robert Florey, and starring Imperio Argentina. It was made as the Spanish-language version of the German film Rendezvous. Such multi-language versions were common during the early years of sound. A separate French version as also released as Love Songs. The film's sets were designed by Julius von Borsody.

Cast
 Imperio Argentina 
 Florelle 
 Julia Lajos 
 Valentín Parera
 Luis Torrecilla

References

Bibliography
 Comas, Àngel. Diccionari de llargmetratges. Cossetània Edicions, 2005.

External links
 

1930 films
Spanish comedy films
1930 comedy films
1930s Spanish-language films
Films directed by Robert Florey
German films based on plays
French films based on plays
French multilingual films
German multilingual films
Spanish black-and-white films
Spanish multilingual films
1930 multilingual films
Films scored by Eduard Künneke
Films with screenplays by Robert Florey